Pop Eyed is a New Zealand compilation album released in 1996 by Flying Nun Records containing only artists signed to the label at the time.

Track listing
"Dust" - 3Ds
"Touch Me" - Superette
"Splat" - Bailter Space
"George" - Headless Chickens
"Save My Life" - Bike
"Too Much Violence" - The Clean
"Fingerpops" - Garageland
"Suck" - Loves Ugly Children
'76 Comeback - King Loser
"Half Man/Half Mole" - Chris Knox
"Afternoon in Bed" - The Bats
"Come Home" - Martin Phillips and the Chills
"Beached" - David Kilgour
"Pet Hates" - Alec Bathgate
"Rocky Mountain" - Bressa Creeting Cake
"Strangleknot" - Chug
"Crystalator" - Dimmer
"Country Sow" - Solid Gold Hell
"Activation" - High Dependency Unit

Compilation albums by New Zealand artists
1996 compilation albums
Flying Nun Records compilation albums
Pop compilation albums
Record label compilation albums